Robert Alexander Shafto Adair, 1st Baron Waveney (25 August 1811 – 15 February 1886) was a British Liberal Party politician who served as a Member of Parliament (MP) for Cambridge for 8 of the years from 1847 to 1857.

Life
Born in Ballymena, County Antrim, Ireland, he was the older of the two sons of Sir Robert Shafto Adair, 1st Baronet, and his first wife Elizabeth Maria Strode. He married  Theodosia Meade in 1836; they had no children.

Adair first stood for election to Parliament in April 1843, when he was the runner-up at a by-election for the Eastern division of Suffolk. He was unsuccessful again at a by-election for the borough of Cambridge in July 1845, but at the 1847 general election he was elected as one of Cambridge's two MPs. He was defeated at the 1852 general election, but that result was overturned on petition and he was returned to the House of Commons at the resulting by-election in August 1854.  He was unseated again in 1857 general election, and, at the 1859 general election, again unsuccessfully contested East Suffolk.  He stood again one more time, in Canterbury at the 1865 general election, but did not win a seat. He was appointed High Sheriff of Antrim in 1853.

A Fellow of the Royal Society, he succeeded to the baronetcy in 1869, on the death of his father. He was ennobled on 10 April 1873, as Baron Waveney, of South Elmham in the County of Suffolk. He was Provincial Grand Master of the United Grand Lodge of England Masonic province of Suffolk at the time of his death.  He served as Lord Lieutenant of Antrim from 1884 until his death in 1886, aged 74, when the peerage became extinct and he was succeeded in the baronetcy by his younger brother Hugh (1815–1902), who had been MP for Ipswich from 1847 to 1874.

Ballymena 
The Adair family owned extensive estates in Ballymena, and have been described as the "founding fathers" of the town. The town is built on land given to the Adair family by King Charles 1 in 1626, on the provision that the town holds two annual fairs and a free Saturday market in perpetuity.

In 1865 Adair began the construction in the demesne of Ballymena Castle, a substantial family residence in the Scottish baronial style. The castle was not completed until 1887, and was demolished in 1957 after having lain empty for some years and being vandalised; the site is now a car park, where said Saturday market is held.  In 1870, Adair donated The People's Park to Ballymena, engaging fifty labourers to work for six months landscaping it.

References

External links 
 
 
 Adair family archives, at the National Archives

Waveney
Waveney
Waveney
Liberal Party (UK) MPs for English constituencies
UK MPs 1847–1852
UK MPs 1852–1857
UK MPs who were granted peerages
Waveney
Waveney
Waveney
Waveney
Freemasons of the United Grand Lodge of England
Peers of the United Kingdom created by Queen Victoria